The Arizona Financial Theatre (formerly known as the Dodge Theatre, the Comerica Theatre and the Arizona Federal Theatre) is a multi-use theatre in Downtown Phoenix, Arizona. The venue seats 5,000 people.

History

Jerry Colangelo, longtime former owner of the Phoenix Suns and Arizona Diamondbacks, was one of the original investors. The facility, designed by Dan Meis of NBBJ, was designed to fill the need for performers that don't need a huge sports stadium, but are too large for the smaller, intimate venues.

It opened in the spring of 2002 as part of the ongoing redevelopment efforts in Downtown Phoenix, and reached the 2 million mark in attendance in 2009. Live Nation began operating the venue in 2007. The theater's name was first changed in October 2010 after Comerica Bank acquired the naming rights.

On December 18, 2019, the theatre was renamed to Arizona Federal Theatre, as Arizona Federal Credit Union owned the naming rights. On July 11, 2022, the theatre was renamed once again to Arizona Financial Theatre after the rebranding of Arizona Federal Credit Union into Arizona Financial Credit Union.

Events
The theatre is probably best recognized as the stage for the comedy movie Blue Collar Comedy Tour: The Movie. In addition to this, George Lopez's most recent HBO Special, America's Mexican, was aired live at the venue. Rock group Chickenfoot recorded their live album Get Your Buzz On there and it also hosted the 2010 WWE Hall of Fame Induction Ceremony and the 2015 NFL Honors. It is also a venue for Broadway and family stage shows that play the Phoenix area, and in the theater's first few years the Arizona edition of the Radio City Christmas Spectacular took place at the venue.

On September 14, 2004, Barney's Colorful World - Barney's fifth stage show and third national stage show tour was taped here.

Mexican pop singer Paulina Rubio performed here on May 14, 2005, on her "Pau-Lenques" tour in support of her 2004 album Pau-Latina. Lorde brought her Pure Heroine Tour to the theatre on April 17, 2014, performing here in between her two shows at Coachella.

Janet Jackson performed a sold-out show at the theatre on April 8, 2011, as part of her Number Ones, Up Close and Personal World Tour. She returned to the theatre on October 19, 2015, as part of her Unbreakable World Tour.

Lana Del Rey performed her first show in Arizona at the theatre on April 15, 2014, as part of her Paradise Tour. Latin singer Yuridia performed here on November 21, 2012, as part of her Para Mí Tour.

Troye Sivan has performed shows here for both his Suburbia Tour and Bloom Tour.

Notable concerts

References

Music venues in Arizona
Sports venues in Phoenix, Arizona
Concert halls in Arizona
NBBJ buildings
Buildings and structures in Phoenix, Arizona
Tourist attractions in Phoenix, Arizona
Sports venues completed in 2002
Music venues completed in 2002
2002 establishments in Arizona